Tony Taylor (born August 9, 1990) is an American professional basketball player for Türk Telekom of the Basketbol Süper Ligi (BSL).

Career
Taylor played 4 seasons of college basketball at the George Washington University, with the George Washington Colonials.

He went undrafted in the 2012 NBA draft. On November 2, 2012, he was selected by the Tulsa 66ers in the 2012 NBA D-League draft.

In the summer of 2013, Taylor signed with Turów Zgorzelec of Poland. With Turow, he won the Polish Championship in the 2013–14 season.

In August 2015, Taylor signed with the Russian club Enisey of the VTB United League. With Enisey, he played in the 2016 FIBA Europe Cup Final Four, where the team finished fourth. After the VTB United League season ended, Taylor signed with Strasbourg IG of France for the rest of the season. On September 11, 2016, he returned to Enisey for the 2016–17 season.

On July 4, 2017, Taylor signed with Turkish club Banvit for the 2017–18 season.

On July 18, 2018, Taylor signed a deal with Italian club Virtus Bologna for the 2018–19 LBA season and Champions League.

On July 26, 2019 he has signed a contract with Pınar Karşıyaka of the Turkish Basketbol Süper Ligi. 

On July 5, 2022, he has signed with Türk Telekom of the Turkish Basketbol Süper Ligi (BSL).

Honours

Club
Turów Zgorzelec
Polish Basketball League: 2014–15
Polish Supercup: 2015
Virtus Bologna
Basketball Champions League: 2018–19

References

External links
Euroleague profile
FIBA profile

1990 births
Living people
African-American basketball players
American expatriate basketball people in France
American expatriate basketball people in Italy
American expatriate basketball people in Poland
American expatriate basketball people in Russia
American expatriate basketball people in Turkey
American men's basketball players
Bandırma B.İ.K. players
Basketball players from New York (state)
BC Enisey players
George Washington Colonials men's basketball players
Karşıyaka basketball players
Lega Basket Serie A players
People from Sleepy Hollow, New York
Point guards
SIG Basket players
Sportspeople from Westchester County, New York
Tulsa 66ers players
Turów Zgorzelec players
Virtus Bologna players